"Winners and Losers" is a song by Hamilton, Joe Frank & Reynolds that became a hit in 1976. It followed their previous hit, "Fallin' in Love".

Background
The songwriting credits are given to Dan Hamilton and Ann Hamilton who are also credited composer of "Fallin in Love". It was released on Playboy Records P 6054 on November 1975.

Chart performance
In November 1975, the song debuted on the Billboard Hot 100 at No. 87. It peaked at No. 21 the weeks of January 24 and 31, 1976, and spent a total of 15 weeks on the chart. It reached No. 5 on the Billboard Easy Listening chart.

Weekly charts

Year-end charts

References

External links
 Lyrics of this song
 

  
1975 singles
Hamilton, Joe Frank & Reynolds songs
Playboy Records singles
1975 songs
Songs written by Dan Hamilton (musician)